Rodrigo Iván González (born 14 April 2000) is an Argentine professional footballer who plays as a defender for Guillermo Brown, on loan from Rosario Central.

Club career
González is a product of the Rosario Central academy. He made his senior breakthrough in March 2019 under manager Paulo Ferrari, who selected him to start a Primera División fixture away to Godoy Cruz on 9 March. He featured for eighty-nine minutes, before receiving a red card following a second bookable offence. In February 2021, González was loaned out to Belgrano until the end of 2021. Ahead of the 2022 season, he was sent on loan at Guillermo Brown for one year.

International career
González previously represented Argentina at U15 level.

Career statistics
.

References

External links

2000 births
Living people
Footballers from Rosario, Santa Fe
Argentine footballers
Association football defenders
Argentine Primera División players
Rosario Central footballers
Club Atlético Belgrano footballers
Guillermo Brown de Puerto Madryn footballers